

Music

Rose is a member of the new folk revival which began in England in the late 2000s with acts such as Mumford and Sons and Laura Marling. and has continued onto American shores with acts such as The Relatives, and Andrew Duncan.

Since the late nineties Rose has collaborated with many musicians, including Jason Szkutek, Daniel Cohen, and Jake White Project.  She has appeared as the lead singer on independently released EPs by Jake White Project.

Influences
A poet and songwriter, she cites Neil Young and Bob Dylan as two of her greatest influences. "We Can Be" of her debut EP "Postage Stamp" was recorded in the same room where Young had just completed his 2009 album "Fork in the Road." "Postage Stamp" was self-released in February 2009 at the request of thousands of online fans who encouraged the singer to self-produce.

The album cut of "You are My Sunshine" was featured on a 2009 national Charter Communications advertisement. http://www.splendad.com/ads/songs/2010

This version of "You are My Sunshine" was also Rose's audition song for the Fox television show X Factor in 2011.

Personal life
She hails from a family of poets, actors, and musicians dating back to the 15th century. Her paternal ancestors began the comedy troupe Commedia dell'arte in the 16th Century; Isabella Andreini, the Inamorata of the group, inspired many of the French poets, notably Isaac du Ryer (d. c. 1631). Andreini was also a poet herself, releasing Rime, a collection of 359 poems in fall of 1601. Rose's “Want You” opens with “you’re an ancient mariner’s rime,” which many believe is not only a reference to the Coleridge poem but also a veiled reference to her late relative.

Releases

 Postage Stamp EP
 "Postage Stamp"
 "Get To Me"
 "We Can Be"
 "Carry On"
 "Want You"
 "You Are My Sunshine"
 "Brighten the Corner"

 'Recreation' (Jake White Project 2004)
(lead vocals on 'forever', 'hold on to the night', 'blind', 'from beginning to end')

References

External links
 
 Myspace
 Youtube

American women singer-songwriters
Living people
1984 births
21st-century American women singers
21st-century American women guitarists
21st-century American guitarists
21st-century American singers
American singer-songwriters